Mouthful of Love is the debut album by rock band Young Heart Attack released in 2004.

Track listing

All tracks written by Young Heart Attack, except Track 8 (written by Fred 'Sonic' Smith) and Track 9 (written by Tight Bro's From Way Back When).
 "Mouthful of Love" - 3:37
 "Starlite" - 3:41
 "El Camino" - 3:22
 "Tommy Shots" - 3:15
 "(Take Me Back) Mary Jane" - 3:46
 "To the Teeth" - 2:08
 "Sick of Doing Time" - 2:40
 "Over and Over" - 4:52
 "In Luck" - 2:15
 "Misty Rowe" - 4:26

Time: 34:07 min.

2004 debut albums
XL Recordings albums
Young Heart Attack albums